The Auld Public Library is a historic building in Red Cloud, Nebraska. It was built in 1917 thanks to a donation from William T. Auld, with William N. Gedney as the general contractor. It was designed in the Classical Revival style by Fiske & Meginnis, an architectural firm based out of Lincoln, Nebraska. It has been listed on the National Register of Historic Places since December 10, 1993.

References

National Register of Historic Places in Webster County, Nebraska
Neoclassical architecture in Nebraska
Library buildings completed in 1917
Public libraries in Nebraska